The McMahon ministry (Liberal–Country Coalition) was the 46th ministry of the Australian Government. It was led by the country's 20th Prime Minister, William McMahon. The McMahon ministry succeeded the Second Gorton ministry, which dissolved on 10 March 1971 following the resignation of John Gorton as Prime Minister. The ministry was replaced by the First Whitlam ministry on 5 December 1972 following the federal election that took place on 2 December which saw Labor defeat the Coalition.

As of 26 January 2023, Tom Hughes is the last surviving Liberal member of the McMahon ministry, while Ian Sinclair and Peter Nixon are the last surviving Country members. Malcolm Fraser was the last surviving Liberal Cabinet minister, and Tony Street was the last surviving assistant minister.

Cabinet

Outer ministry

Assistant ministers

References

Ministries of Elizabeth II
Australian Commonwealth ministries
1971 establishments in Australia
1972 disestablishments in Australia
Cabinets established in 1971
Cabinets disestablished in 1972